Mess Around or Messing Around or variants may refer to:

"Mess Around", song by Ray Charles
"Mess Around" (Cage the Elephant song)
"Mess Around", song by Redd Kross from Show World (1997)
"Messed Around", song by Squeeze
Messing Around or Messin' Around
"Messin' Around" (Memphis Slim song), R&B chart No. 1 hit by Memphis Slim, 1948
"Messin' Around" (Pitbull song), song by Pitbull featuring Enrique Iglesias, 2016
"Messin' Around", instrumental by drummer Max Roach and trumpeter Dizzy Gillespie from Max + Dizzy: Paris 1989
"Messin Around", song by Andre Nickatina from Unreleased
"Messin' Around", song by Sebadoh from Bubble & Scrape, 1993
Messin' Around, jazz album by Molly Johnson, 2006 (nominated at the Juno Awards of 2007)

See also
"Stop Messin' Round", by Fleetwood Mac